Pope Theodoros I of Alexandria, also known as St. Theodorus (Theodore), was the 45th Pope of Alexandria and Patriarch of the See of St. Mark.  He was a monk in a monastery near Mariout, which was known as the monastery of Tanboura, under the guidance of a virtuous elder called Yoannis (John).  Coptic literature states that Yoannis was inspired by the Holy Spirit that his disciple Theodoros would one day become a Pope and he told those who were in authority.

It is said that Theodoros struggled in his worship, and was perfect in his humility and meekness. He was selected to become the Pope of Alexandria.  During his papacy he shepherded his flock by reading and preaching to his people, especially on Sundays and on feast days. He completed 12 years of papacy and died in peace.

He is also known as Theodosius II in Coptic history.

8th-century Coptic Orthodox popes of Alexandria